Banksia laricina, commonly known as the rose banksia, is a species of shrub that is endemic to southwestern Western Australia. It has crowded, linear leaves with a short point on the tip, golden brown flowers with a bright yellow style and prominent egg-shaped follicles.

Description
Banksia laricina is a shrub that typically grows to a height of  but that does not form a lignotuber.

Taxonomy

Banksia laricina was first formally described in 1964 by West Australian botanist Charles Gardner in the Journal of the Royal Society of Western Australia from specimens he collected in July 1958. The specific epithet (laricina) is derived from Latin, meaning larch-like.

In 1981, George placed this species in the series Abietinae. Cladistic analysis in a 1996 paper by Kevin Thiele and Pauline Ladiges suggested that the closest relatives of B. laricina appeared to be B. incana and B. tricuspis. In their taxonomic arrangement, Thiele and Ladiges placed B. laricina in series Abietinae, subseries Longistyles.

Thiele and Ladiges' arrangement was not accepted by George, and was largely discarded by him in his 1999 arrangement in Flora of Australia.

Distribution and habitat
Rose banksia is restricted to a small area near the Moore River and Regans Ford where it grows in low woodland.

Conservation status
Banksia laricina is classified as "not threatened" by the Western Australian Government Department of Parks and Wildlife.

Use in horticulture
Rarely cultivated, Banksia laricina will grow on sandy well drained soils in a sunny position. It may require extra water during summer dry periods and take some time (up to 18 months) to establish well. Seeds do not require any treatment, and take 19 to 51 days to germinate.

References

laricina
Eudicots of Western Australia
Endemic flora of Western Australia
Plants described in 1964